Rumyan Hovsepyan (born 13 November 1991) is an Armenian football player who plays for Alashkert in the Armenian Premier League. Hovsepyan is also a member of the Armenia national football team. He usually plays as a defensive midfielder.

Career

Club
Hovsepyan left FC Shirak on 9 June 2017 by mutual consent.

On 26 June 2019 he signed a contract with the newly promoted to the Bulgarian First League team Arda Kardzhali. On 27 July, he scored the historic first ever goal for the team from Kardzhali in the top division of Bulgarian football, netting the equalizer in the 3:1 home win over Beroe.

International
Hovsepyan played his first international game with the national team on 27 May 2014, in a friendly against the United Arab Emirates. He scored his first international goal on his debut match.

Career statistics

Club

International

Statistics accurate as of match played 9 November 2017

International goals
Scores and results list Armenia's goal tally first.

Family 
His father Andranik Hovsepyan, in Soviet times played for FC Ararat Yerevan, the top scorer of the 1993 Armenian Premier League. He was also a player of the Armenia national football team.

References

External links

1991 births
Living people
Armenian footballers
Footballers from Yerevan
Association football midfielders
Armenia international footballers
Armenian expatriate footballers
FC Urartu players
FC Metalurh Donetsk players
FC Stal Kamianske players
FC Pyunik players
FC Arda Kardzhali players
Armenian Premier League players
Ukrainian Premier League players
First Professional Football League (Bulgaria) players
Expatriate footballers in Ukraine
Armenian expatriate sportspeople in Ukraine
Expatriate footballers in Bulgaria